Come-Back! is a 1981 Dutch drama film directed by Jonne Severijn and starring Theu Boermans. The film was selected as the Dutch entry for the Best Foreign Language Film at the 54th Academy Awards, but was not accepted as a nominee.

Cast
 Ab Abspoel as Maas
 Bert André as Pater
 Barbara Barendrecht
 Theu Boermans as Ab Goeree
 Huib Broos as Harry
 Edmond Classen as Arts
 Arnica Elsendoorn
 Ge Frankenhuizen
 Ad Frigge as Niemeyer
 Paul Gieske as Hans
 Marina de Graaf as Verpleegster

See also
 List of submissions to the 54th Academy Awards for Best Foreign Language Film
 List of Dutch submissions for the Academy Award for Best Foreign Language Film

References

External links
 

1981 films
1981 drama films
Dutch drama films
1980s Dutch-language films